2009 Italian Athletics Indoor Championships was the 40th edition of the Italian Athletics Indoor Championships and were held in Turin.

Champions

See also
2009 Italian Athletics Championships

References

External links
 FIDAL web site

Italian Athletics Championships
Athletics
Italian Athletics Indoor Championships